The 2009 Trophée des Champions Final was a football match that was played on 25 July 2009. The match was contested between the winners of 2008–09 Coupe de France, En Avant Guingamp, and the 2008–09 Ligue 1 champions, FC Girondins de Bordeaux. The match was played, for the first time, on international soil at the Olympic Stadium in Montreal, Canada with the objective being to promote French professional football abroad.

Bordeaux captured their 3rd Trophée des Champions overall and their second straight after defeating Guingamp 2–0 with goals from the Argentine Fernando Cavenaghi in the 39th minute and the Brazilian Fernando Menegazzo in the 90th minute.

Match details

See also
2008–09 Ligue 1
2008–09 Coupe de France

References

External links
Match statistics

2009–10 in French football
2009
2009 in Canadian soccer
International club association football competitions hosted by Canada
FC Girondins de Bordeaux matches
En Avant Guingamp matches
Sports competitions in Montreal
July 2009 sports events in Canada
Soccer in Quebec